Vishal (विशाल) is a name for males. Vishal means great, grandeur, magnificence, prominence, illustriousness and eminence. The meaning is also attributive to the property of being grand.

Etymology
The word Vishal finds its origins in the ancient language of Sanskrit. Vishal is also a common adjective found in North and South Indian languages such as Hindi, Tamil, Marathi, Telugu and Gujarati.

Religious significance

Supreme consciousness

Vishalta (Hindi & Sanskrit: विशालता) comes from the word Vishal and is a state of mind that is often embraced by different religious and spiritual leaders in India. The word embodies the ultimate state of selflessness, or belief that the body, mind, and all worldly possessions belong to God. One in a state of Vishaltha believes that the body is only a tool for carrying out the wishes of the Lord.

Buddhism

It has been suggested that one of Buddha's favorite resorts, Vaishali, was named after King Vishal, a ruler during the times of Ramayana. There exists several ancient buddhist monuments as well as a large, but ruined fort, which is believed to be built by King Vishal.

Related names
Vaishali (Hindi & Sanskrit: वैशाली)
Yash (Hindi & Sanskrit: यश) - somewhat similar meaning to Vishal but not exactly

People with the name

Industrialists and business professionals
Vishal Gondal (born 1976), Indian entrepreneur
Vishal Sikka, Indian CEO and MD of Infosys

Movies, TV and entertainment
Vishal (actor) (born 1977), Indian film actor
Vishal Bhardwaj (born 1965), Indian music composer
Vishal Dadlani, Indian music composer of Vishal–Shekhar
Vishal Veeru Devgan, better known as Ajay Devgn, Indian movie actor
Vishal Karwal (born 1984), Indian actor
Vishal Mahadkar (born 1978), Indian film director
Vishal Malhotra (born 1981), Indian actor and presenter
Vishal Singh (TV actor) (born 1974), television actor from India
Vishal Sinha, Indian cinematographer
Vishnu Vishal (born 1987), Indian actor and producer

Sports
Vishal Bharat (born 1978), British Virgin Islands cricketer
Vishal Dabholkar (born 1987), Indian cricketer
Vishal Joshi (born 1989), Indian cricketer
Vishal Kumar (born 1992), Indian footballer
Vishal Marwaha (born 1976), Scottish field hockey player
Vishal Singh (polo player), Indian polo player
Vishal Tripathi (born 1988), English cricketer
Soeuy Visal, Cambodian footballer

Others
Vishal Arora, journalist, writer, photojournalist, and videographer
Vishal Dadlani (born 1977), Indian singer
Vishal Garg (born 1973), Indian academician
Vishal Mangalwadi (born 1949), Indian author
Vishal Mishra (composer), Indian music composer and singer
Vishal Sareen (born 1973), Indian chess player

See also
Vishal (disambiguation)

Indian given names